Nicole and Natalie is the second studio album by the New York City-based duo Nina Sky. It was released on July 31, 2012. Three singles were released from the album: "Day Dreaming", "Heartbeat" and "Comatose". One of the most known songs from the album is the opening track "Starting Today". The song was recorded in 2007 for their unreleased album with the same name. On February 2, 2012, Nina Sky released the lead single from their upcoming second studio album, Nicole and Natalie. The single, entitled "Day Dreaming", was produced by Beau Vallis. The video for the song, directed by Adam Sauermilch, was released on February 28. On June 14, the band released "Heartbeat", the second single from the new album. A month later, on July 27, the video for "Heartbeat" was released. Concerning the video, the band stated: "We knew we wanted it to be more about the feeling of the song and less about the story. The colors, environment, and everyone dancing in their own element creates this surreal feeling of freedom. It’s just about listening to the rhythm inside you and letting that rhythm guide you." On July 31 the album was released. On June 9, 2012, Nina Sky also performed at OUT/LOUD Queer Women's Music Festival in Eugene, Oregon alongside artists such as Krudas Cubensi, Tender Forever and Andrea Gibson.

Background

In July 2007 Nina Sky released new single "Get Your Clothes Off" and they have announced new album due to release on July 27, 2007. Album was never released. In 2008, they released two hit-singles for their unreleased album: "Curtain Call" and "On Some Bullshit". After falling out with Polo Grounds Music, Nina Sky decided to release music independently. Album contained singles: "Day Dreaming", "Heartbeat" and "Comatose".

In 2007, Nina Sky have recorded their second studio album. For that album they also recorded song "Starting Today". That song was later put on their new studio album as an opening track. After four years they started recording new material set to release in 2012.

Singles
"Day Dreaming" was released as the album's lead single on February 2 on the duo's official website. They filmed a music video with Adam Sauermilch in mid-February and released on February 28. The clip features the girls as two separate sides of a relationship, sweet and loving and then bitter and resenting.

"Heartbeat" was released as the second single on June 14. They teamed up with Adam Sauermilch once again for the music video. The video was released on July 27. It features the sisters prancing through fields during a party with multi-colored smoke.

"Comatose" was released on June 26 as a promo single. It was later released as the third official single from the album on October 24, 2012. Its video was directed by BRTHR and released on November 6, 2012. It featured the girls in a room full of multi-colored lights and a couple running to meet each other.

Songs
There were eight tracks on the album. Opening track "Starting Today" was written and produced by The Smeezingtons. Second, third and fourth tracks were released as singles. These tracks were "Day Dreaming" (February 2), "Heartbeat" (June 14) and "Comatose (October 24). Album features Lee Wilkie on sixth track "Everytime". Seventh track "Bright Lights" features house sound. Album finishes with pop track "Makeover".

Track listing

Release history

References

External links 
 https://soundcloud.com/nina_sky/sets/nicole-natalie-full-album

2012 albums
Albums produced by the Smeezingtons
Nina Sky albums